The Garcia Opera House, at Terry Ave. and California St. in Socorro, New Mexico was built in 1886.  Its owner hoped to attract opera, but there is no record of any traveling opera company stopping.  It did host travelling theatre performances, masked balls, and other functions.

It was listed on the National Register of Historic Places in 1974.

References

Opera houses		
National Register of Historic Places in Socorro County, New Mexico
Buildings and structures completed in 1886